Rikkert Faneyte (born May 31, 1969) is a former Major League Baseball outfielder who played from  to  for the San Francisco Giants and Texas Rangers. He was a member of the Dutch National Team which finished in fifth place at the 2000 Summer Olympics in Sydney, Australia.

Career
Faneyte grew up playing baseball starting at the age of four in the Netherlands and played college baseball at Miami-Dade South Junior College.

Faneyte made his major league debut in 1993, becoming the third player from the Netherlands to play in the majors.

Faneyte was traded to the Cincinnati Reds in December 1996.

Faneyte also played for the L&D Amsterdam Pirates of Honkbal Hoofdklasse after finishing his major league career. He also picked up the save in the Netherlands' 2000 Olympics 4-2 win against Cuba.

References

External links

1969 births
Living people
Baseball players at the 1988 Summer Olympics
Baseball players at the 2000 Summer Olympics
Clinton Giants players
Dutch expatriate baseball players in the United States
Major League Baseball players from the Netherlands
Major League Baseball center fielders
Oklahoma City 89ers players
Olympic baseball players of the Netherlands
Phoenix Firebirds players
San Francisco Giants players
San Jose Giants players
Sportspeople from Amsterdam
Texas Rangers players